Sorel is a subsidiary of Columbia Sportswear based in Portland, Oregon that manufactures and distributes shoes.

History
Sorel was originally a line of winter sport/work boots that were introduced in 1962 by the Kaufman Rubber Company of Kitchener, Ontario. They became its most successful product line. Kaufman Rubber Co. became Kaufman Footwear in 1964. Kaufman Footwear declared bankruptcy in 2000. The Sorel trademark was bought by Columbia Sportswear. Following Columbia's purchase, the Sorel brand was expanded to other products, such as nylon outerwear and other work-related garments.

References

External links 
 www.sorel.com — Sorel Brand site 

Companies based in Portland, Oregon
Shoe brands
Clothing companies established in 1962
1962 establishments in Ontario